Gary Wortman was an assistant coach in the National Basketball Association (NBA). He coached and scouted for the Seattle SuperSonics as well as the Atlanta Hawks during his career with the NBA.

Player 
Wortman played at Seattle Pacific University under head coach Les Habegger, who also become the general manager of the Sonics during 1983 until 1985.

Career

Kentridge High School 
Wortman coached at Kentridge High School.

Seattle SuperSonics 
Wortman was hired as an assistant coach and scout for the Seattle SuperSonics. He worked with the Sonics for three years, where he was known for great relationships with both players and coaching staff.

Atlanta Hawks 
Wortman spent his last years in the NBA as an assistant coach for the Atlanta Hawks. He would remain assistant coach for the team until his death in 2000.

Death 
On October 27, 2000, Wortman died from brain cancer at the age of 59.

References 

Seattle SuperSonics assistant coaches
1941 births
2000 deaths